Marketing Authorisation Application (MAA) is an application submitted by a drug manufacturer seeking marketing authorisation, that is permission to bring a medicinal product (for example, a new medicine or generic medicine) to the market.

MAA is part of the official procedure before the Medicines and Healthcare products Regulatory Agency in the United Kingdom and the Committee for Medicinal Products for Human Use of the European Medicines Agency, a specialised agency of the European Commission. In the United States, the equivalent process is called New Drug Application.

References

Drug safety